The 2017 Miami RedHawks football team represented Miami University in the 2017 NCAA Division I FBS football season. They were led by fourth-year head coach Chuck Martin and played their home games at Yager Stadium in Oxford, Ohio as members of the East Division of the Mid-American Conference. They finished the season 5–7, 4–4 in MAC play to finish in a tie for third place in the East Division.

Previous season 
The RedHawks finished the 2016 season 6–7, 6–2 in MAC play to finish in a tie for the East Division championship with Ohio. Due to their head-to-head loss to Ohio, they did not represent the East Division in the MAC Championship Game. They were invited to the St. Petersburg Bowl where they lost to Mississippi State.

Miami became the first team in FBS history to start the regular season 0–6 and finish the regular season at 6–6.

Preseason 
In a preseason poll of league media, Miami was picked to finish in second place in the East Division, though they received more first place votes than Ohio. They received one vote to win the MAC Championship Game.

Coaching staff

Source:

Schedule
Miami announced their 2017 football schedule on March 1, 2017.

Game summaries

at Marshall

Austin Peay

Cincinnati

at Central Michigan

at Notre Dame

Bowling Green

at Kent State

Buffalo

at Ohio

Akron

Eastern Michigan

at Ball State

References

Miami
Miami RedHawks football seasons
Miami RedHawks football